Estádio da Baixada was a football stadium located in Porto Alegre, Brazil. It was the home ground of Grêmio Foot-Ball Porto Alegrense from 1904 until 1954, when it was replaced by the Estádio Olímpico Monumental. The capacity of the stadium was 15,000 spectators.

References

 Stadium history

Defunct football venues in Brazil